Harold Jeppe (24 January 1899 – 4 March 1975) was a South African hurdler. He competed in the men's 110 metres hurdles at the 1920 Summer Olympics.

References

1899 births
1975 deaths
Athletes (track and field) at the 1920 Summer Olympics
South African male hurdlers
Olympic athletes of South Africa
Sportspeople from Johannesburg
South African Republic people